North Carolina's 46th House district is one of 120 districts in the North Carolina House of Representatives. It has been represented by Republican Brenden Jones since 2017.

Geography
Since 2023, the district has included all of Columbus County, as well as part of Robeson County. The district overlaps with the 8th and 24th Senate districts.

District officeholders

Multi-member district

Single-member district

Election results

2022

2020

2018

2016

2014

2012

2010

2008

2006

2004

2002

2000

References

North Carolina House districts
Columbus County, North Carolina
Robeson County, North Carolina